The Technical University of Applied Sciences Wildau ('UAS Wildau' for short) is the largest of five universities of applied sciences in the federal state of Brandenburg, Germany. TH Wildau was founded as a technical university of applied sciences in 1991, but its connection to engineering education dates back further to the late 1940s. Today it sits on a modern and compact campus, with direct S-Bahn access to Germany's capital city, Berlin.

History

The history of Wildau begins with fishermen's families that settled by the Dahme River and then came to deliver sand, gravel and bricks from the region by boat to Berlin. Mechanical engineering put Wildau on the map as a location for industry.

1889-1933: Growing Industrial Region 
Berlin Machine Building Corporation (B.M.A.G.), formerly L. Schwartzkopff, became one of the leading railway locomotive manufacturers in Germany in the late 19th century. The original plant, located in the centre of Berlin, became insufficient to meet the growing demands of railway operators. Therefore, the company began looking for a new plant site in the surrounding area around Berlin. An area of 600.000 sqm adjacent to Goerlitz Railway, close to the town of Hoherlehme, was eventually chosen for this purpose in 1889.

The entire production of high-speed rotating machinery, generators, and electrical equipment was not long after relocated to B.M.A.G.'s new plant. From these beginnings, a new company - Maffei-Schwartzkopff Co. Ltd. - emerged, which in the following years equipped all Schwartzkopff and Maffei E-locomotives with electricity. In the aftermath of the Great Depression (1931), however, the site had to be closed.

1933-1945: Wildau under the National Socialist Regime 
In 1934 AEG took possession of the former Maffei-Schwartzkopff site and converted it into a feeder plant for aviation industries. Armament production began in 1936. Torpedoes, grenade shells, propeller hubs, cannon tubes, mortars and artillery were all produced. But two larger scale projects would become infamous. The locomotive plant at Wildau produced the infamous “Schienenwolf” (“rail wolf”), which the German Wehrmacht deployed during their retreat from the Soviet Union and Italy. And in the large locomotive assembly hangar 15/16, AEG employees built the armored locomotive of the “Führersonderzug“ (or 'Hitler's chartered train').

In April 1945, the Soviet Army occupied Wildau. Not long after, it was decided that all production halls should be demolished and all gear and equipment from B.M.A.G. and AEG removed.

1949-1955: Engineering Education Begins 
In mid-September 1949 the 'Vocational School of Locomotive and Wagon Construction' was founded and specialist engineering education in Wildau officially began. Engineering studies began with a group of just 5 students. Initially, the prescribed period of study was set to be “not significantly more than two years”.

In September 1953 the school was renamed “Technical School of Heavy Machinery Construction” and was assigned to the Ministry of Heavy Machinery Construction. Two years later, it was renamed again, this time as “Engineering School for Heavy Machinery” (ISW). Master engineers were trained, initially in evening classes, but in distance learning courses as well.

1956-1991: Skilled Engineering Professionals 

The scope and focus of the school grew more general over the years. In 1964 it was renamed "The Engineering School of Mechanical Engineering Wildau" to reflect this. On account of being assigned, in the 1970s, to the GDR's Ministry of Tool and Processing Machinery Construction, Wildau had access to various tools at an early stage. In fact, one of the first computer systems of the GDR, type ZRA 1, was installed in Wildau.

During the 1980s, further courses of study for technicians were initiated and other courses were expanded. A new building on Friedrich-Engels-Strasse, with a large auditorium, began construction as well.

1991: Founding of the University of Applied Sciences Wildau 
The end of the GDR and the reunification of Germany brought immense changes. In October 1991 the federal state of Brandenburg founded the University of Applied Sciences Wildau. Other Universities of Applied Sciences throughout Brandenburg - in Lausitz, Potsdam, Brandenburg, and Eberswalde, for instance, were founded at the same time under the same Decree.

Location

Proximity to Berlin 

TH Wildau is a campus university located just south of Berlin. The campus can be reached directly using the S-Bahn line 46 (direction Königs Wusterhausen) to the Wildau S-Bahn station. The university is located directly in front of the station.

With the bus lines 736, 737, and 738, the university can also be reached directly. The regional train line RE2 (direction Cottbus Hauptbahnhof) as well as the line RB24 (direction Senftenberg) allow for further accessibility of the university from Berlin with a change in Königs Wusterhausen.

By car you can reach the university via the Bundesautobahn 10 (Berliner Ring) via the exit Königs Wusterhausen as well as via Federal Highway (Bundesstraße) 179.

Regional Growth Centre 
TH Wildau is also part of one of Brandenburg's fastest growing regional growth centres ('regionale Wachstumskerne'), dubbed the Schönefeld Cross ('Schönefelder Kreuz'). It consists of the cities of Königs Wusterhausen and Wildau, along with the municipality of Schönefeld. It encompasses the new Berlin-Brandenburg airport region, which will become quite active once Willy Brandt Berlin-Brandenburg airport (BER) opens in October 2020 (if current estimates of the start of operations are accurate).

The university also borders (to the North) the town of Zeuthen, which is home to the second campus of the German Electron Synchrotron ('DESY'), part of the Institute of High Energy Physics. DESY is a national research center that operates particle accelerators and investigates the structure of matter.

In an adjacent district of Brandenburg (to the East) lies the district of Oder-Spree, which will be the home of Tesla's recently announced Gigafactory, its first in Europe.

Degree programmes

The Technical University of Applied Sciences Wildau has 15 Bachelor's programmes and 15 Master's programmes. Alongside the traditional engineering disciplines, the range of degrees at the university includes courses in natural sciences, engineering, economics, law, business administration and management. TH Wildau is the only university in Brandenburg to offer Logistics, and the first university in the whole of Germany with a degree in Telematics. It is also the first University of Applied Sciences in Germany with a degree in Biosystems Technology/ Bioinformatics.

Students can earn internationally recognized academic degrees such as master's and bachelor's degree (according to the Bologna Process).

Students can pursue Master's programmes in English at the university's graduate school, the Wildau Institute of Technology

Research & Development

TH Wildau has a strong research focus. In comparison to other small universities of applied sciences, it has done exceptionally well in obtaining third-party research funding. Over 203,000 EUR was raised in third-party funding for each professor in 2015; in 2017, the university raised 11 million EUR - two thirds of its budget.

TH Wildau stands out in three key areas of research, which have been publicised on the research map of the conference of vice chancellors:

 Applied life sciences
 Informatics/telematics
 Optical technologies/photonics

The university further specialises in the research fields of production and materials, transport and logistics as well as management and law.

TH Wildau is also home to two research institutes: the Institute of Life Sciences and Biomedical Technologies and the Institute for Materials, Development and Production.

International Partnerships

Since its foundation in 1991, TH Wildau has cooperated with more than 150 universities in over 60 countries across the world.

TH Wildau currently awards double degrees with partner institutions from China, France, Georgia, Italy, Kazakhstan, Russia, and Spain. It has also established a trilateral Joint Degree program in Logistics and Supply Chain Management together with Universitat Autonoma de Barcelona in Spain and Riga Technical University in Latvia.

TH Wildau also currently has about 70 active partnerships with international partner universities around the world. Many of these cooperations include arrangements for student and/or staff exchange.

A list of current partnerships can be found below:

References

External links
TH Wildau (English)
TH Wildau (German)
Wildau Institute of Technology

Wildau
Universities and colleges in Brandenburg
1991 establishments in Germany
Technical universities and colleges in Germany